Frances Helen Godfrey (born 29 June 1953) is a former BBC Radio 2 newsreader, most famous for her appearances on Wake Up to Wogan, a long-running breakfast show in the United Kingdom. Godfrey began contributing to Wake Up to Wogan in 1993 and made her final appearance on the show on 9 May 2008.

Biography and career

Born in Hampstead, London, Godfrey left England at the age of two to live in Southern Rhodesia (now Zimbabwe), returning four years later with parents and brothers Tony and Nick to live for a short time near Oxford, before moving to Highcliffe in Dorset.  She was educated at the Convent of the Cross, and the Polytechnic of Central London before moving into secretarial work for several years in London and Bournemouth.

In 1980 she approached the independent local radio station in Bournemouth – 2CR – and accepted a job as a Technical Operator. Godfrey then became Assistant to the Commercial Producer, which involved creative writing and producing. In 1984, Godfrey began presenting, and in time presented every type of programme on the station.

She joined the BBC network in September, 1990, but rose to prominence becoming part of the team for Wake Up to Wogan in 1993. Godfrey was associated with the programme for many years as one of several newsreaders who would appear on a rotation basis; her contemporaries in this respect being Alan Dedicoat and John Marsh. She moved from presenting the early morning news in the late 2000s, but continued to present bulletins for Radio 2 until she left the station in 2014.

In September 2012 it was announced that Godfrey would take voluntary redundancy along with her colleague, Fenella Fudge at the end of the year. Her decision came about as the BBC made budget cuts as part of its Delivering Quality First initiative. As part of the programme the broadcaster would reduce the number of its continuity announcers and merge the news teams for separate networks, but returned to the BBC after her voluntary redundancy leave.

In March 2016 Godfrey joined new Bauer Radio digital station Mellow Magic as its breakfast show presenter and remains as the show's presenter.

During her time with Wake up to Wogan Godfrey received many emails on air, including poetry which often began "I've fallen in love with Fran Godfrey", and tales of her "Cupboard under the stairs"; once again quoting Sir Terry:
"Fran's lavish penthouse has been the scene of many an unsavoury tale: honest artisans imprisoned for weeks in the cupboard under her stairs, lured there on the pretext of urgent plumbing, grouting, or rendering..."

Fran is a past President of Hospital Radio Bedside, a radio station that broadcasts to hospitals in Bournemouth, Poole, Christchurch and Wimborne, UK

References

External links
Official website and contact details (dead link Jan 2022)
Mellow Breakfast with Fran Godfrey on Mellow Magic
Another biography

1953 births
Living people
People from Hampstead
Alumni of the University of Westminster
British radio personalities
BBC newsreaders and journalists